Sore Eros is an American indie band started by Robert Robinson around the early 2000s in Connecticut.  Branded as lo-fi, pop music with psychedelic elements. In 2007 Robinson began collaborating with a long lost friend, Adam Langellotti which soon became their first official release, Second Chants. Sore Eros is now an equally collective effort incorporating Jeff Morkeski on lead guitar and Matt Jugenheimer on drums.

Sore Eros has been working on a new full-length album with Adam Granduciel of The War on Drugs producing. This project has been in the works for several years.

Discography
 Second Chants (2009) Shdwply Records 
 Know Touching (2010) Shdwply Records
 Taal Compass/Wide Open (2010) Blackburn Recordings
 Just Fuzz (2011) Blackburn Recordings
 Sickies Volume 1 (2011) Night People
 Sickies Volume 2 (2012) Feeding Tube Records
 9" Lathe Cut Split w/ Kurt Vile (2012) Feeding Tube Records
 Kurt Vile/Sore Eros - Jamaica Plain 10" (2013) Care In The Community Records
 Say People (2015) LP/VHS Feeding Tube Records
 Sore Eros /self titled (2020) Double LP Feeding Tube Records

References

External links
 Bandcamp Page 
 Discography 
 Pitchfork Review by Jayson Greene 
Tiny Mix Tapes, Second Chants Review by parallelliott
All Music Guide review by Ned Raggett 
Dusted, Second Chants Review By Michael Cramer 
Drowned In Sound, Second Chants Review by Paul Brown 
Altsounds Second Chants Review by Eli Tor

 Pitchfork News by Matthew Strauss

Musical groups established in 2002
Indie pop groups from Connecticut
2002 establishments in Connecticut
People from Enfield, Connecticut